Maria Milczarek (1929-2011) was a Polish politician (Communist). She was the Cabinet Minister of Administration, Land Economy and Environment in 1976–1979, and Minister of Labor, Welfare and Social Policy in 1979–1980.

References 

1929 births
2011 deaths
Women government ministers of Poland
20th-century Polish politicians
20th-century Polish women politicians